Eidolon is an album by the German melodic black metal band Dark Fortress. This is the first album with Nassos as a real band member. Morean already appeared on Séance as the composer of the song Incide and the arranger of the string section used in the song While They Sleep. The reason he became a member was based on his musical and vocal abilities, his personage and dedication to extreme and dark music. He is responsible for the lyrical concept of Eidolon.

This release is a concept album based on the Greek idea of an astral double, which is similar to the German concept of a doppelgänger.

Track listing

Notes
  Thomas Gabriel Fischer (Celtic Frost, Triptykon) appears as a guest vocalist on the song Baphomet.
  A video of the song Edge of Night was made and can be viewed at their MySpace page.

Personnel
Dark Fortress
 Morean – vocals
 V. Santura – lead guitar
 Asvargr – guitar
 Draug – bass guitar
 Paymon – keyboard
 Seraph – drums

Additional musicians and production
 Thomas Gabriel Fischer – vocals on Baphomet
 V. Santura – production, recording, engineering, mixing and mastering
 Christophe Szpajdel – logo

Release dates
Release dates are confirmed by their website.

External links
 Dark Fortress on Myspace
 Encyclopaedia Metallum (retrieved 10-18-08)

References

2008 albums
Dark Fortress albums
Century Media Records albums